Andrew A. Jacono, M.D., FACS (born October 30, 1970) is an American facial surgeon and creator of the minimal access deep-plane extended  facelift, a minimally invasive hybrid facelift. Jacono starred in the Discovery Fit & Health television program Facing Trauma as the volunteer surgeon who reconstructed faces disfigured in abusive relationships and other violent circumstances.

He is the founder of the New York Center for Facial Plastic & Laser Surgery and the co-founder of Through Healing All Indigent (THAI) Children, a non-profit organization committed to helping impoverished children in third-world countries receive free plastic surgery for their facial deformities. Jacono has been named one of America's top plastic surgeons by Harper's Bazaar, Castle Connolly, the Consumers Research Council of America and Super Doctors.

Education
After completing his undergraduate studies in chemistry at Muhlenberg College in Allentown, Pennsylvania, Jacono earned his medical degree from the Albert Einstein College of Medicine in New York. He completed an internship in general surgery at St. Vincent's Hospital and Medical Center, after which he completed his surgical residency in head and neck surgery at the New York Eye and Ear Infirmary. Jacono then continued further training with a fellowship in aesthetic facial plastic and reconstructive surgery at the New York Eye and Ear infirmary. Jacono then continued further training with a fellowship in aesthetic facial plastic and reconstructive surgery at the University of Rochester.

He is dual board certified in facial plastic and reconstructive surgery and in otolaryngology/head and neck surgery and is a Fellow of the American College of Surgeons.

Career
Jacono is an associate clinical professor, Division of Facial Plastic & Reconstructive Surgery at Albert Einstein College of Medicine. He serves as section head of facial plastic & reconstructive surgery at North Shore University Hospital at Manhasset. Additionally, Jacono serves as director of the New York Center for Facial Plastic & Laser Surgery in New York, New York and fellowship director of the American Academy of Facial Plastic and Reconstructive Surgery.

Jacono has written three consumer books, Face the Facts: The Truth About Facial Plastic Surgery Procedures That Do and Don't Work, The Face of the Future: Look Natural, Not Plastic—A Less Invasive Approach to Enhance Your Beauty and Reverse Facial Aging, and The Park Avenue Face: Secrets and Tips from a Top Facial Plastic Surgeon for Flawless, Undetectable Procedures and Treatments.

Surgical procedure contributions
Dr. Jacono has had medical articles published in peer-reviewed journals, including Aesthetic Surgery Journal, JAMA, Facial Plastic Surgery and Aesthetic Plastic Surgery.

Jacono developed and published his work on the MADE facelift, a surgical procedure that combines the features of a deep plane face lift with those of the short-scar minimal access cranial suspension lift. This procedure results in a more significant vertical motion of the mid-face and jawline, leading to a more natural-looking outcome, and produces greater neck rejuvenation with a notable decrease in the need for additional tucks and hidden scars. Since then, he has performed further research and studies which have resulted in the advancement and modification of the deep plane facelift approach. The latest was published in the Aesthetic Surgery Journal in November 2018 in his paper "A Novel Extended Deep Plane Facelift Technique for Jawline Rejuvenation and Volumization."

Volunteer work
In additional to his aesthetic work, Jacono is mission team leader for numerous charity organizations aimed at helping children throughout the world with limited medical and financial resources receive plastic surgeries. These include Healing the Children Northeast and H.U.G.S. Foundation. To date, Jacono has completed surgery on more than 500 children with cleft lip & palate deformities and micotia. He also serves as senior advisor to the American Academy of Facial Plastic Surgery's FACE TO FACE program, a national project offering pro-bono consultations and surgery to survivors of domestic violence who have suffered facial disfigurement. To date, Jacono has provided pro-bono reconstructive surgery to over 100 female victims.

Personal
Jacono has four children from two previous relationships.

Added publications
The Minimal Access Deep-plane face-lift as an alternative in the smoking patient. Parikh SS, Jacono AA; Arch Facial Plast Surg. 2011 Jul-Aug;13(4):283-5. 
A Novel Extended Deep Plane Facelift Technique for Jawline Rejuvenation and Volumization.
Jacono AA, Bryant LM, AhmedliNN. Aestheti Surg J. 2018 Nov 12.
Effect of perioperative hyperbaric oxygen on bruising in face-lifts. Strong BC, Jacono AA. Arch Facial Plast Surg. 2010 Sep-Oct;12(5):356-8.
Anatomic comparison of the deep-plane face-lift and the transtemporal midface-lift. Jacono AA, Stong BC. Arch Facial Plast Surg. 2010 Sep-Oct;12(5):339-41. 
Combined Transconjunctival release and Midface Lift for Post-blepharoplasty ectropion repair. Jacono AA and Stong BC. Arch Facial Plast Surg. 2010 May-Jun; 12(3):206-8.
Anatomic Comparison of the Deep Plane Facelift and the Transtemporal Midface Lift. Jacono AA and Strong BC. Arch Facial Plast Surg. Arch Facial Plast Surg. 2010;12(5):339-341.
Effect of Hyperbaric Oxygen on Bruising in Face Lifts. Jacono AA and Stong. Arch Facial Plast Surg. 2010;12(5):356-358.
A New Classification of Lip Zones to Customize Injectable Lip Augmentation. Jacono, AA. Arch Facial Plastic Surg. 2008 Jan-Feb; 10(1):25-9.
A Wrinkle Correction with Injectable Fillers. Jacono A. Plastic Surgery Products 2007; 32–36.
Effects of Endoscope Forehead/midface-lift on Lower Eyelid Tension. Villano M, Leake DS, Jacono A and Quatela VC. Arch Facial Plastic Surg. 2005 Jul-Aug; 7(4):22-30.
Quantitative Analysis of Lip Appearance after V-Y Lip Augmentation. Jacono A. and Quatela VC. Arch Facial Plast Surg. 2004;6(3):172-7.
Extended Centrolateral Endoscopic Midface Lift. Quatela, VC and Jacono, A. Facial Plastic Surg 2003;19(2):199-208.
Structural Grafing in Rhinoplasty. Quatela VC and Jacono A. Facial Plast Surg 2003;18(4): 223-232
Rejuvenation of the Aging Lip with an Injectable Acellular Dermal Graft (Cymetra). Sclafani AP, Romo T 3rd, Jacono A. Arch Facial Plastic Surg 2002:4(4): 252–257.
Homologous Collagen Dispersion (Dermalogen) as a Dermal Filler: Persistence and Histology Compared with Bovine Collagen. Sclafani A, Romo T3rd, Jacono A, et al. Ann Plastic Surgery 2002;49(2):181-8.
Evaluation of acellular Derman Graft (Alloderm) Sheet for Soft Tissue Augmentation: A 1-year follow-up of Clinical Observations and Histological Findings. Sclafani A, Romo T3rd, Jacono A, et al. Arch Facial Plast Surg 2001;3(2):101-3.
Transconjunctival versus Transcutaneous Upper and Lower Blepharoplasty. Jancono AA and Moskowitz B. Facial Plast Surg 2001; 17(1):21-27
Endoscopic Forehead Lifing and Contouring. Romo T, Jacono AA, and Sclafani A. Facial Plast Surg 2001; 17(1):3-10.
Alloplastic Implants for Orbital Wall Reconstruction. Jacono AA and Moskotitz B. Facial Plast Surg 2000;16(1):63-68.
Nasal Reconstruction Using Porous Polyethylene Implants. Romo T, Sclafani A, and Jacono A. F. Facial Plast Surg 2000;16(1):55-62.
Pedicled myocutaneous flaps in head and neck surgery. Jacono A and Moscatello A. Operative Techniques in Otolaryngology-Head and Neck Surgery 2000; 11(2):139-142. 
The Role of TGFB-1 and MBPs In Metaplastic Bone Formation in Nasal Polyps. Jacono A, Selafani A, Winicki R, Van De Water TR, McCormick S, and Franz D. Otolaryngol Head Neck Surg 2001;125(1);96-7
Evaluation of Acellular Dermal Graft in Sheet (AlloDerm) and Injectable (Micronized AlloDerm) Forms for Soft Tissue Augmentation. Sclanfani A, Romo T, Jacono A, Cocker R, and McCormick S. Arch Facial Plast Surg. 2000;2:130-136.
Autologous Collagen Disperson (Autolegen) as a Dermal Filler. Sclafani A, Romo T, Parker A, McCormick S, Cocker R, and Jacono A. Arch Facial Plast Surg. 2000;2:48-52.
Rhytidectomy, SMAS Facelift. Jacono A, and Williams J. E-medicine. 2006.
Structural Support in Correction of Cleft Nasal Deformity. Jacono A, and Gorney M. E-medicine. 2006.
Lower Lid Blepharoplasty and Festoons. Jacono A, Furnas D. E-medicine. 2006.
 Laser Resurfacing. Jacono A and Alatai S. E-medicine 2006.

References

External links
web site

1970 births
Living people
American plastic surgeons
Albert Einstein College of Medicine alumni
Participants in American reality television series
Fellows of the American College of Surgeons